City on Fire is a 1979 disaster action film directed by Alvin Rakoff, written by Jack Hill, Dave Lewis, and Celine La Freniere, and stars Barry Newman, Susan Clark, Shelley Winters, Leslie Nielsen, James Franciscus, Ava Gardner, and Henry Fonda. The film's plot revolves around a disgruntled ex-employee who sabotages an oil refinery, setting off a blaze which engulfs an entire city. People try to either fight the fire or flee as it spreads throughout the city.

The film was shot in Montreal, Quebec, Canada, although the name of the city is not mentioned in the film.

Plot
In an unnamed U.S. city, the corrupt mayor William Dudley has allowed an oil refinery to be built right in the center of town, far from any river, lake or reservoir. On one typically hot summer day, Herman Stover, a dangerously disturbed employee at the refinery, has been denied an expected promotion and in addition, finds himself fired after refusing a departmental transfer. He then decides to take his revenge against the works by opening the valves to the storage vats and their interconnecting pipes, flooding the area and sewers with gasoline and chemicals. It doesn't take long for this act of petty vandalism to start a fire, which starts a chain reaction that causes massive explosions at the refinery, destroying it and spreading a mushroom-cloud of flame that soon engulfs the entire metropolis. Two welders are working underground and the sparks they create begin the fire. The drama focuses on a newly built hospital which, like the refinery and all civic buildings that went up during the mayor's crooked administration, is shoddily built and poorly equipped. There, head doctor Frank Whitman and his staff treat thousands of casualties from the fire while the city fire chief Risley keeps in constant contact with the fire companies fighting a losing battle against the fires, and Maggie Grayson, an alcoholic reporter, sees it as her chance to make it nationwide with her coverage of the story of the "city on fire".

A major subplot of the film involves Diana Brockhurst-Lautrec, a wealthy socialite (and widow of the late governor who is the namesake of the hospital) who is currently and secretly involved with Mayor Dudley to further advance her rank up the social circles. The womanizing Dr. Whitman also meets with Diana before the hospital's dedication ceremony, having known her previously. Herman Stover also arrives at the hospital during the dedication ceremony, having left the refinery before the explosion to stalk Diana, and having known her since attending high school. Diana finds herself, along with the mayor, assisting Dr. Whitman & head nurse Andrea Harper with treating the large number of casualties arriving at the hospital. No one ever finds out that Stover is the one responsible for the citywide fire, and Stover is not sane enough to understand or regret his actions.

When the hospital becomes surrounded by the fire, Chief Risley orders his son, Capt. Harrison Risley and his firemen to create a "water tunnel" composed creating a channel of firehoses across a burning street to evacuate the hospital. Despite some casualties of the hospital staff and patients, the evacuation is successful. Stover is one of the casualties when, distraught and in a daze after Diana rejects him, is killed by falling debris from a building. Nurse Harper is also killed when she attempts to rescue Stover. Diana, Mayor Dudley, and Dr. Whitman are the last ones to make it out of the hospital before it is consumed by the fire.

The final scene is set the following day at a quarry outside the city which is set up as a makeshift camp for the thousands of people rendered homeless by the fire as it is finally brought under control. There, Dr. Whitman and Diana acknowledge their love for each other, while Mayor Dudley gives a press statement that the real heroes are the people of the city. Maggie Grayson, still reporting from the studio, signs off her broadcast and leaves with her assistant Jimbo on a date for assisting her throughout her coverage. The final scene shows Chief Risley leaving his headquarters with his staff telling them that it takes only one man to destroy a city.

Cast

Production
The film required several urban blocks that could be set on fire which led to the production team to search for appropriate locations to shoot, including Atlanta, Edmonton, St. Louis, and Cincinnati. Montreal was eventually chosen to represent the fictional American city in the film. Principal photography was scheduled to begin 10 August 1978 and became one of the largest film sets in Canada to that date, costing approximately $400,000. The shoot was constructed in the east end of the city and involved  45,000 gallons of fuel required to set it ablaze during filming.

Release
City on Fire was first shown in West Germany on May 24, 1979, then in Paris on July 11, 1979. It was later distributed in Canada by Astral Films, showing in Montreal on Astral Films on 29 August 1979. It opened in United States on 31 August 1979.

Reception
From a contemporary review, Gilbert Adair of the Monthly Film Bulletin declared that "'dull' as criticism, scarcely does justice to the ludicrous contrivance of this disaster movie" and that "its idiocy is best exemplified by the scene in which, as the crooked mayor and the jet-setting benefactress of a hospital resolve their amours differences, the camera focuses on the beatific expression of an elderly patient who has finally managed to relieve himself into a bedpan."

The film was featured on an episode of Mystery Science Theater 3000.

See also
List of firefighting films

References

Sources

External links

Mystery Science Theater 3000 
 
 Episode guide: K16- City on Fire

1979 films
1970s disaster films
1970s action drama films
American action drama films
American disaster films
Canadian action drama films
Canadian disaster films
Embassy Pictures films
English-language Canadian films
Films about arson
Films shot in Montreal
Films about firefighting
1970s English-language films
Films directed by Alvin Rakoff
1970s American films
1970s Canadian films